Sherwood Manor is a census-designated place (CDP) within the town of Enfield in Hartford County, Connecticut, United States. The population was 5,410 at the 2010 census.

Geography
The CDP is in the northern part of the town of Enfield, bordered to the west by Interstate 91, to the north partially by Brainard Road, to the east by Connecticut Route 192 (N. Maple Street), and to the south by Connecticut Route 220 (Elm Street/Shaker Road). Thompsonville borders Sherwood Manor to the west, across I-91.

According to the United States Census Bureau, the CDP has a total area of 3.1 square miles (8.1 km2), all of it land.

Demographics
As of the census of 2000, there were 5,689 people, 2,184 households, and 1,644 families residing in the CDP. The racial makeup of the CDP was 96.47% White, 1.14% African American, 0.05% Native American, 1.07% Asian, 0.47% from other races, and 0.79% from two or more races. Hispanic or Latino of any race were 1.83% of the population.

There were 2,184 households, out of which 28.5% had children under the age of 18 living with them, 65.0% were married couples living together, 7.4% had a female householder with no husband present, and 24.7% were non-families. 19.6% of all households were made up of individuals, and 8.4% had someone living alone who was 65 years of age or older.  The average household size was 2.60 and the average family size was 3.01.

In the CDP, the population was spread out, with 22.6% under the age of 18, 6.0% from 18 to 24, 28.9% from 25 to 44, 26.9% from 45 to 64, and 15.5% who were 65 years of age or older.  The median age was 40 years. For every 100 females, there were 94.4 males.  For every 100 females age 18 and over, there were 93.2 males.

The median income for a household in the CDP was $56,641, and the median income for a family was $62,019. Males had a median income of $46,118 versus $32,500 for females. The per capita income for the CDP was $24,839.  About 1.1% of families and 1.6% of the population were below the poverty line, including 0.5% of those under age 18 and 3.3% of those age 65 or over.

References

Enfield, Connecticut
Census-designated places in Hartford County, Connecticut
Census-designated places in Connecticut